Jubelina is a genus in the Malpighiaceae, a family of about 75 genera of flowering plants in the order Malpighiales. Jubelina comprises 6 species of woody vines  occurring in tropical wet primary and secondary forests of Central America and South America.

External links and reference

 Malpighiaceae Malpighiaceae - description, taxonomy, phylogeny, and nomenclature
Jubelina
Anderson, W. R. 1990a. The taxonomy of Jubelina (Malpighiaceae). Contributions from the University of Michigan Herbarium 17: 21–37.

Malpighiaceae
Malpighiaceae genera